Amazonas Province was one of the provinces of the Empire of Brazil. It was created in 1850 from territory of Grão-Pará Province.

In 1889 it became Amazonas (Brazilian state).

1850 establishments in Brazil
1889 disestablishments in Brazil
Former countries in South America
Provinces of Brazil